Lake Gura Minei (Romanian: Lacul Gura Minei) is a natural salt lake in the town of Ocna Sibiului, Sibiu County, Transylvania, Romania. It is one of the many lakes of the Ocna Sibiului mine, a large salt mine which has one of the largest salt reserves in Romania.

Name 
Literally translated from Romanian, "Lacul Gura Minei" means "the mine's mouth lake".

History 
Lake Gura Minei was formed by the collapse of a shaft in the north of the Ignaţiu salt mine, opened in 1780.

Information 
Surface: 
Maximum depth:

Lakes of the salt mine 
 Auster 
 Lake Avram Iancu-Ocniţa
 Balta cu Nămol 
 Brâncoveanu 
 Cloşca 
 Crişan
 Lacul Fără Fund 
 Gura Minei 
 Horea 
 Mâţelor 
 Negru
 Pânzelor 
 Rândunica 
 Verde (Freshwater lake)
 Vrăjitoarelor (Freshwater lake)

References 
 

Lakes of Sibiu County